Kalika  is a town and market center in Punarbas Municipality in Kanchanpur District in Sudurpashchim Province of south-western Nepal. The former village development committee was merged to form new municipality on 18 May 2014. At the time of the 1991 Nepal census it had a population of 8233 people living in 1406 individual households.

References

Populated places in Kanchanpur District